Bryers is a surname. Notable people with this surname include:

Duane Bryers (1911-2012), American artist and sculptor
Paul Bryers (born 1955), British film director, screenwriter, and author
Rhonda Bryers (1952-2007), New Zealand singer of Maori descent

See also
Breyers
Bryer